Afraid to Love is a 1927 American silent comedy film directed by Edward H. Griffith and written by Doris Anderson, Francis de Croisset, Fred de Gresac, Alfred Hustwick and Joseph Jackson. The film stars Florence Vidor, Clive Brook, Norman Trevor, Jocelyn Lee and Arthur Lubin. The film was released on April 9, 1927, by Paramount Pictures.

It is based on the 1902 play The Marriage of Kitty by Cosmo Gordon Lennox, a version of the French play La Passerelle by Francis de Croisset and Fred de Gresac. The play was previously adapted into the 1915 film The Marriage of Kitty.

Synopsis
When Sir Reginald Belsize's uncle dies he leaves him a fortune on condition that he give up his current unsuitable lover Helen and marry someone else within twenty four hours. Helen agrees to this so long as the woman he picks is less attractive than she is. The woman he picks is however beautiful and cultured and he quickly falls in love with her.

Cast 
Florence Vidor as Katherine Silverton
Clive Brook as Sir Reginald Belsize
Norman Trevor as John Travers
Jocelyn Lee as Helen de Semiano
Arthur Lubin as Rafael

Preservation status
The film is now lost.

See also
The Marriage of Kitty (1915)

References

External links 
 
 

1927 films
1920s English-language films
Silent American comedy films
1927 comedy films
Paramount Pictures films
Films directed by Edward H. Griffith
American black-and-white films
Remakes of American films
American films based on plays
Films based on works by Francis de Croisset
Lost American films
American silent feature films
1927 lost films
Lost comedy films
Films set in London
Films set in Paris
1920s American films